Android 1.6 Donut is the fourth version of the open source Android mobile operating system developed by Google. Among the more prominent features introduced with this update were added support for CDMA smartphones, additional screen sizes, a battery usage indicator, and a text-to-speech engine.

After the public release of Donut—its official dessert-themed code name, the convention employed by Google to designate major Android versions—carriers were quick to follow with its roll out to customers in the form of an over-the-air (OTA) update for compatible smartphones.

On September 27, 2021, Google announced it would no longer allow signing in on Android devices that run Android 2.3.7 Gingerbread or older, requiring Android 3.0 (on tablets) or 4.0 (phone and tablets) or higher to log in.

Features 
 

New features introduced by Donut include the following:
 Voice and text entry search enhanced to include bookmark history, contacts, and the web.
 The ability for developers to include their content in search results.
 Multi-lingual speech synthesis engine to allow any Android application to "speak" a string of text.
 Easier searching and the ability to view app screenshots in Android Market.
 Gallery, Camera and camcorder more fully integrated, with faster camera access.
 The ability for users to select multiple photos for deletion.
 Updated technology support for CDMA/EVDO, 802.1x, VPNs, and a text-to-speech engine.
 Support for WVGA screen resolutions.
 Speed improvements in searching and camera applications.
 Expanded Gesture framework and a new GestureBuilder development tool.

See also 
 Android version history
 iPhone OS 3
 Mac OS X Snow Leopard
 Windows Mobile 6.5
 Windows 7

References

External links 
 
 

Android (operating system)
2009 software